Parapercis johnsoni, the Polynesian sandperch, is a fish species in the sandperch family, Pinguipedidae.

Etymology
The fish is named in honor of Jeffrey W. Johnson, of the Queensland Museum  in Australia.

References

Pinguipedidae
Taxa named by Hans Hsuan-Ching Ho
Fish described in 2015